Beni Khaled is a village of Minya Governorate in Egypt.

External links
location of Beni Khaled

Populated places in Minya Governorate